The Hallam Line is a railway connecting Leeds and Sheffield via Castleford in the  West Yorkshire Metro area of northern England. It is a slower route from Leeds to Sheffield than the Wakefield line. Services on this line are operated by Northern. Services from Leeds to Nottingham also use the line.

West Yorkshire MetroCards are available on trains between Leeds and Darton, north of Barnsley and South Yorkshire Travelmaster tickets are available in the South Yorkshire area.

Origin of name
The line is named after the manor of Hallam which included Sheffield at the time of the Domesday Book (1086). At this time the local area was known as Hallamshire—the names Hallam and Hallamshire are still used today by many local companies and organisations.

History
Before the 1923 grouping the route followed by the line was owned as follows:
 Leeds–Methley: Midland Railway
 Methley–Normanton: Midland Railway 
 Methley–Castleford–Normanton: North Eastern Railway
(alternate route since 1988)
 Normanton–Barnsley: Lancashire and Yorkshire Railway
 Barnsley, Jumble Lane to Quarry Junction: Great Central Railway
 Barnsley, Quarry Junction to Sheffield: Midland Railway 
After 1921 the entire route, except Methley to Normanton via Castleford, and the short stretch from Barnsley (Jumble Lane) to Quarry Junction, became part of the London, Midland and Scottish Railway until 1948 when the network was nationalised. Midland Railway trains made use of Barnsley Court House station and so avoided any contact with Great Central / L.N.E.R. metals.
(Note: The route that exists today was not possible until 1960 when B.R. added a connection at Barnsley (Quarry Junction) to allow trains to use Exchange station and reach the Midland line to Sheffield).

Route details

Trains on the line serve the following places; some stations may no longer be open: 
 Leeds railway station: in MR days trains would have operated from Wellington station. Here there is a triangular junction with the line to Bradford. The line from here to Castleford is also served by Pontefract Line services.
 Hunslet (Closed)
 here was the junction with the East & West Yorkshire Union Railway (MidR/Great Northern Railway (GNR) joint: it was a direct connection to Wakefield via Rothwell
 Woodlesford
 Methley: station closed
 between here and Castleford there were several junctions: with the Methley Joint Railway (GNR/L&YR/North Eastern Railway (NER); with the NER line Leeds to York; and with the Swinton & Knottingley Railway to Pontefract 
 Either goes to a branch towards Castleford where it then reverses towards Normanton which stopping trains use or alternatively goes a more direct route bypassing Castleford and past the former Altofts railway station which closed in 1990 towards Normanton station that Leeds–Sheffield fast trains use.
 Normanton
 here the MidR main line to Sheffield branched off: our route now uses the L&YR metals 
 Wakefield Kirkgate (Also served by the Pontefract and Huddersfield lines)
 Horbury Junction (closed) for the L&YR main line to Manchester
 Crigglestone (Closed)
 A pair of parallel single-track tunnels, Woolley Tunnels (1745 yd; 1570 m), which take the line directly under Woolley Edge services, a motorway service station on the M1 motorway, and under the motorway itself
 Haigh (Closed)
 Darton
 here was Silkstone Junction for the freight line to Silkstone. 
 Barnsley: formerly Barnsley Exchange, traffic arrived not only from Leeds but via the Great Central Railway line from Penistone. This is nowadays known as the Penistone line. 
Stations from here to Sheffield are also on the Penistone line:
 Swaithe Viaduct – carries the line over the Worsborough Branch of the Great Central.
 Wombwell  
 Elsecar was Elsecar & Hoyland
 Wentworth – also known as Wentworth & Hoyland Common and Wentworth & Tankersley. (Closed)
 Chapeltown: formerly Chapeltown South to distinguish from Chapeltown Central on the former South Yorkshire Railway, later G.C.R. line. Chapeltown station was rebuilt nearer to the town centre roundabout in the 1970s as the first railway project of the, then, new South Yorkshire Passenger Transport Authority. Much of the original remains. 
From here the two railways – MidR and GCR had parallel lines to Sheffield. The latter line is closed and lifted.
 Ecclesfield – known as Ecclesfield West to distinguish from Ecclesfield East on the former South Yorkshire Railway, later G.C.R. line. (Closed)
 Meadowhall:, partly built on the site of Wincobank and Meadow Hall
 Brightside (Closed)
 Attercliffe Road (Closed)
 Sheffield Midland station  (also served by the Wakefield and Dearne Valley lines)

References

External links
Includes a map of the line and gives details of Metrocard fares

Rail transport in West Yorkshire
Rail transport in South Yorkshire
Rail transport in Sheffield
Barnsley
Transport in Leeds
Transport in the City of Wakefield
Railway lines in Yorkshire and the Humber